Ryan James Clarke (born 30 April 1982) is an English professional footballer who plays as a goalkeeper for National League South club Bath City. He previously trained with the England under-18 squad in La Manga.

Career

Bristol Rovers
Born in Bristol, Clarke started his career with Bristol Rovers; during his time on Rovers' books he had spells on loan at Kidderminster Harriers, Southend United and Forest Green Rovers, where he worked with former England wicketkeeper Jack Russell as his goalkeeper coach.

Salisbury City
Clarke joined Salisbury City from Bristol Rovers in August 2006.

In the summer of 2008, he broke a metatarsal while on holiday. This setback lead to James Bittner claiming the number one shirt from him, and Clarke was then loaned out to Northwich Victoria to reduce the club's wage bill.

Oxford United
Clarke joined Oxford United on 26 May 2009. He was their regular goalkeeper in the 2009–10 campaign and, despite his scoring an own goal in the 2010 Conference Premier play-off Final against York City on 16 May, his Oxford side still secured a return to the Football League after a four-year exile as 3–1 winners. At the end of the season, Clarke was voted Player of the Year by the Oxford supporters for his feats between the posts.

On 12 January 2011, Oxford United announced that Clarke had signed a three-and-a-half-year contract, meaning he would stay at the club until 2014. On 30 January 2014, he signed another three-year deal, keeping him at the club until 2017.

Northampton Town
Clarke signed for League Two club Northampton Town on a two-year contract on 2 July 2015.

AFC Wimbledon and Eastleigh
On 21 June 2016, Clarke joined League One newcomers AFC Wimbledon on a one-year contract. On 21 September Clarke moved to Eastleigh on a two-year deal. In April 2017 Clarke's contract with Eastleigh was terminated with mutual consent.

Torquay United
On 24 June 2017, Clarke signed for National League club Torquay United. He was transfer-listed by Torquay at the end of the 2017–18 season.

Career statistics

Honours
Salisbury City
Conference South play-offs: 2006–07

Oxford United
Conference Premier play-offs: 2009–10

References

External links

Ryan Clarke profile at the Eastleigh F.C. website

1982 births
Living people
Footballers from Bristol
English footballers
Association football goalkeepers
Bristol Rovers F.C. players
Southend United F.C. players
Kidderminster Harriers F.C. players
Forest Green Rovers F.C. players
Salisbury City F.C. players
Northwich Victoria F.C. players
Oxford United F.C. players
Northampton Town F.C. players
AFC Wimbledon players
Eastleigh F.C. players
Torquay United F.C. players
Bath City F.C. players
English Football League players
National League (English football) players